Marko Klasinc (born 14 May 1951) is Slovenian chess problemist.

He composed almost 200 chess problems, mostly heterodox and retrograde ones (12 included in FIDE Album). He has title FIDE solving master and international judge of FIDE for chess composition. As a good solver he represented Yugoslavia 1982 in Varna, where the team became World Champion solving chess problems.

He is the president of Committee for Chess Compositions of Chess Federation of Slovenia.

References 
Notes

Bibliography
 Drinovec, Aleš (editor). Slovenski šah. Šahovska zveza Slovenije, Ljubljana 2002.

External links 
 Website
 Klasinc problems on PDB Server

1951 births
Living people
Chess composers
International Judges of Chess Compositions
Slovenian chess players